Stylidium uliginosum is a dicotyledonous plant that belongs to the genus Stylidium (family Stylidiaceae) and is one of the few species in the genus that is not native to Australia. It is an erect annual plant that grows from 4 to 15 cm tall. Obovate or elliptical leaves, about 7-16 per plant, form basal rosettes around compressed stems. The leaves are generally 4.5–11 mm long and 2–4.5 mm wide. This species generally has one to seven scapes and cymose inflorescences that are 4–15 cm long. Flowers are white. S. uliginosum is endemic to Southeast Asia and has a wide distribution, ranging from Thailand to the Guangdong province of southern China. The type location is in Sri Lanka, but it may be extinct there now. Earlier reports list this species as also occurring in Queensland and other parts of Australia, but this was before subsequent revisions revealed those occurrences in Australia were really a different species, S. tenerum, that resembled S. uliginosum. Its typical habitats include sandy, moist soils in open savannah and sandy earth banks at an altitude of less than 200 metres. It flowers from October to March. S. uliginosum is most closely related to S. kunthii and S. tenerum.

See also 
 List of Stylidium species

References 

Carnivorous plants of Asia
Flora of China
Flora of Indo-China
uliginosum